The World Federation of Music Therapy (WFMT) is an international, non-profit music therapy corporation, organized under the laws of the state of North Carolina in the USA. The WFMT's mission is to promote global awareness of both the scientific and artistic nature of the profession, while also contributing to its development. The Federation advocates for the recognition of music therapy as an evidence-based profession through its support of educational programs, clinical practice, and research. WFMT is divided into eight global regions representing different parts of the world: Africa, Australia/New Zealand, North America, Latin America, Southeast Asia, Europe, Eastern Mediterranean, and Western Pacific. Detailed listings of countries within each region can be found in the federation's bylaws, posted on its website.

History 
In 2010, the WFMT celebrated its 25th anniversary. The seeds for the development of the World Federation of Music Therapy were sown during the second World Congress of Music Therapy in Buenos Aires in 1976. A group of American, European, and South American music therapists met and started to develop a plan for unity and standards in the international arena of music therapy. Among the ten founding members were Rolando Benenzon (Argentina), Giovanna Mutti (Italy), Jacques Jost (France), Barbara Hesser (USA), Amelia Oldfield (UK), Ruth Bright (Australia), Heinrich Otto Moll (Germany), Rafael Colon (Puerto Rico), Clementina Nastari (Brazil), and Tadeusz Natanson (Poland). The Federation was formally established during the 5th World Congress of Music Therapy in Genoa, Italy, in 1985. Anecdotal reports about the beginnings of WFMT as well as the founder’s motivation can be found at the online journal, Voices.

Leadership 
WFMT leadership consists of 20 individuals serving in a volunteer capacity as officers, commissioners, or regional liaisons. The officers are the President, Past President, Secretary/Treasurer, and the Executive Assistant. The commissioners oversee committees related to one of eight areas: education & training, clinical practice, global crises intervention, publications, research & ethics, accreditation & certification, public relations, and world congress organization. Regional liaisons, a new position as of 2008, reside in the WFMT global regions they represent and collect and disseminate information related to developments in the profession. The Assembly of Student Delegates, started in 2011, consists of student leaders representing each of WFMT's global regions and is facilitated by the Executive Assistant.

The WFMT Council uses online sources such as the WFMT website, blog, podcasts, videos, social media, emails and an annual report to communicate with its members and others associated with music therapy. The WFMT Council also holds symposia, panels, and roundtables at major international conferences to inform others about global music therapy developments and the most recent projects in WFMT.

World Congresses of Music Therapy 
The World Congress of Music Therapy is held every three years in a different country. Music therapy professionals and experts in related fields from around the world gather at the congress to share ideas, experiences, trends, and research outcomes. The World Congress of Music Therapy is hosted by a WFMT organizational member in conjunction with a local host.

Previous congress locations include:

1. Paris, France (1974)

2. Buenos Aires, Argentina (1976)

3. San Juan, Puerto Rico (1981)

4. Paris, France (1983)

5. Genoa, Italy (1985) - Founding of the World Federation of Music Therapy (WFMT)

6. Rio de Janeiro, Brazil (1990)

7. Vitoria, Spain (1993)

8. Hamburg, Germany (1996)

9. Washington, D.C., USA (1999)

10. Oxford, England (2002)

11. Brisbane, Australia (2005)

12. Buenos Aires, Argentina (2008)

13. Seoul, South Korea (2011)

14. Vienna and Krems, Austria (2014)

15. Tsukuba, Japan (2017)

External links 
 WFMT (official webpage)

References 

Music therapy
Music organizations based in the United States